Hans-Werner Moors (born 24 July 1950) is a German former professional football player, who played as a defender, and later manager.

References

1950 births
Living people
German footballers
TuRU Düsseldorf players
SC Preußen Münster players
Arminia Bielefeld players
Houston Hurricane players
ASC Schöppingen players
Association football defenders
Bundesliga players
2. Bundesliga players
West German expatriate footballers
Expatriate soccer players in the United States
West German expatriate sportspeople in the United States
German football managers
SC Preußen Münster managers
SG Wattenscheid 09 managers
Rot-Weiß Oberhausen managers
VfL Osnabrück managers
Rot-Weiss Essen managers
KSV Hessen Kassel managers
SV Wilhelmshaven managers
Holstein Kiel managers
Footballers from Düsseldorf
West German football managers
West German footballers